FreeAgent is cloud-based accounting software company based in Edinburgh, Scotland.

History

FreeAgent was launched in September 2007. The company was founded by Ed Molyneux, Olly Headey and Roan Lavery.

In 2012 FreeAgent acquired the American startup 60mo, in order to expand into the US market. It topped Deloitte's list of fastest growing technology firms in 2013.

In 2015, FreeAgent raised over £1 million via crowdfunding with Seedrs.

In November 2016, FreeAgent became a public company, floating on the London Stock Exchange.

In 2018, the Royal Bank of Scotland Group acquired FreeAgent for £53 million.

See also

 Business and economics portal
 Comparison of accounting software

References

External links 

Accounting software
British companies established in 2007
Royal Bank of Scotland
Software companies of Scotland
Software companies established in 2007
Companies based in Edinburgh